Rejhan Šmrković (born December 18, 1991) is a Serbian cross-country skier. He competed for Serbia at the 2014 Winter Olympics in the cross country skiing events.

References

1991 births
Living people
Olympic cross-country skiers of Serbia
Cross-country skiers at the 2014 Winter Olympics
Serbian male cross-country skiers